The 1976 United States presidential election in Ohio took place on November 2, 1976. All 50 states and the District of Columbia were part of the 1976 United States presidential election. State voters chose 25 electors to the Electoral College, who voted for president and vice president.

Ohio was won by former Georgia Governor Jimmy Carter (D) by a margin of 0.27%, which made the state almost 2% more Republican than the nation-at-large. , this is the last election in which Adams County and Brown County voted for a Democratic presidential candidate, the last time until 2020 when Wood County voted for a losing candidate, and the last time that a Democrat would win Ohio while losing neighboring Michigan.

The state was not only one of the closest states in the election, but it was called for Carter after he won Wisconsin, the tipping-point state of the election. This being said, even if Ford carried Ohio, Carter would still have retained 272 electoral votes, enough to win the presidency.

Results

Results by county

See also
 United States presidential elections in Ohio

References

Ohio
1976
1976 Ohio elections